Taiwan Asti Eric Jones (born July 26, 1988) is an American football running back and return specialist who is currently a free agent. He was drafted by the Oakland Raiders in the fourth round of the 2011 NFL Draft. He played college football at Eastern Washington.

High school career
Born in San Francisco, Jones graduated from Deer Valley High School in Antioch, California, where he played high school football, in 2007. He was the Contra Costa Times Player of the Year and also earned first team San Francisco Chronicle All-Metro honors as a running back. Jones was also named MVP of the Bay Valley Athletic League and was his team's MVP on offense. He set his school's single season record with 19 touchdowns as a two-way starter. He rushed for 1,466 yards (9.3 yards per carry) and 13 touchdowns, and also scored three touchdowns receiving and two on punt returns. On defense, Jones had 37 tackles with a sack and three interceptions. One of his interceptions he returned for a score. He led the Wolverines to a 10-0 regular season record and their first league title.

In addition to football, he was also a standout athlete for the school's track team. At the prelims of the 2007 CIF State Track & Field Championships, he ran career-best times of 10.53 seconds in the 100 meters and 21.32 seconds in the 200 meters, placing 2nd and 7th, respectively.

College career
Jones signed with Eastern Washington in 2007 as a cornerback and was redshirted. Jones started four games at cornerback in 2008 after missing much of the first part of the season with a broken fibula suffered in the first week of preseason practices.

In 2009, Jones was moved to running back, the position he played in high school. Jones scored on an 87-yard run on his first collegiate carry and went on to earn third team All-America honors from both the Associated Press and The Sports Network. He was also a first team All-Big Sky Conference selection. Jones finished with 1,213 rushing yards in 2009 to rank as the sixth-most in school history. He ranked in the top 10 in FCS in rushing (ninth, 101.1 yards per game), scoring (sixth, 9.50 points per game) and all-purpose yards per game (second, 195.4 yards per game). His 2,345 all-purpose yards (rushing, receiving, returns) were the second-most in school history, and his 19 touchdowns and 114 total points both rank fourth. Jones also returned a kickoff 93 yards for a touchdown against Northern Colorado.

Jones finished the 2010 season with 1,742 rushing yards and 14 touchdowns during Eastern Washington's national championship season. Jones missed the semifinal and championship games with a broken foot suffered in the Eagles' FCS quarterfinals game against North Dakota State. During the game, Jones managed to rush for 230 yards. Jones was named a first team All-American and was also named the Big Sky Conference Co-Offensive Player of the Year.

Professional career
After his junior season, Jones announced that he would forgo his senior season and enter the 2011 NFL Draft. Jones did not participate in the NFL Combine due to his foot injury, but he fully participated in all drills during his pro day in mid-April.

Oakland Raiders
Jones was drafted by the Oakland Raiders in the fourth round (125th overall) of the 2011 NFL Draft. He made his NFL debut in Week 7 against the Kansas City Chiefs, and saw action both running and receiving the ball, as well as on special teams.

In 2013, Raiders general manager Reggie McKenzie stated that Jones would switch from running back to cornerback.

On February 24, 2014, Jones and the Raiders agreed on a three-year contract extension.

At the beginning of the Raiders' 2015 offseason activities, it was announced that new head coach Jack Del Rio had switched Jones back to running back.

On July 28, 2017, Jones was released by the Raiders.

Buffalo Bills
On August 2, 2017, Jones was signed by the Buffalo Bills. He was placed on injured reserve on November 4, 2017, after suffering a broken arm in Week 9.

On March 16, 2018, Jones re-signed with the Bills. He was named a team captain for the 2018 season for his role on special teams. He was placed on injured reserve on October 31, 2018 with a neck injury.

Houston Texans
On May 14, 2019, Jones signed with the Houston Texans. His 34-yard reception in overtime set up the Texans' winning field goal against the Buffalo Bills in the Wild Card Round.

Buffalo Bills (second stint)

Jones re-signed with the Buffalo Bills on March 30, 2020. In the AFC Championship against the Kansas City Chiefs, Jones recovered a fumble lost by wide receiver Mecole Hardman on a punt return during the 38–24 loss.

Jones re-signed with the Bills on March 29, 2021. On April 4, 2022, Jones re-signed again with the Bills on a one year contract.

NFL career statistics

Regular season

Postseason

References

External links

Houston Texans bio
Oakland Raiders bio
Eastern Washington Eagles bio

1988 births
Living people
American football cornerbacks
American football return specialists
American football running backs
Buffalo Bills players
Eastern Washington Eagles football players
Ed Block Courage Award recipients
Houston Texans players
Oakland Raiders players
Players of American football from San Francisco